Carol Marcus may refer to:
 Carol Marcus (Star Trek), character in the 1982 film Star Trek II: The Wrath of Khan and the 2013 film Star Trek Into Darkness
 Carol Grace, also referred to as Carol Marcus, American actress and author